Judith Roode (1943–2018) was an American artist and teacher. From 1977 to 1992 Roode taught drawing at the Minneapolis College of Art and Design. As an artist she was known for her expressive drawings, which have been exhibited widely, published in drawing guides, and included in the collections of the Minneapolis Institute of Art, Walker Art Center and Weisman Art Museum, among other institutions.

Work and career 
From 1977 to 1992, Roode was a professor at the Minneapolis College of Art and Design, where she taught Life Drawing and Visual Journals courses. Throughout her career Roode was also an active member of the Women's Art Resources of Minnesota (WARM). In 1982, Roode created a mentor program for WARM that paired successful, established artists with emerging protégés. She also served as the program's first director until 1988. Over 450 women artists have been served by the mentorship program since its inception.

In the 1990s, Roode retired from teaching to manage a painful medical condition that limited her mobility, reflex sympathetic dystrophy.

Selected solo and group exhibitions 

 2008 – Judith Roode BODY SONGS, A 25-Year Retrospective, 1967-1991, January 28 – March 2, 2008, Catherine G. Murphy Gallery, College of St. Catherine, St. Paul, MN
 2013 - The House We Built: Feminist Art Then and Now, January 22 – February 23, 2013, Katherine E. Nash Gallery, Regis Center for Art, University of Minnesota   
 2018 - Roots and Fruits: Exploring the History and Impact of the Women’s Art Registry of Minnesota, November 3 – December 18, 2018, Catherine G. Murphy Gallery, College of St. Catherine, St. Paul, MN

Selected public collections 
 Minneapolis Institute of Art, Minneapolis, MN 
 Minnesota Historical Society, Saint Paul, MN
 Walker Art Center, Minneapolis, MN
 Weisman Art Museum, Minneapolis, MN

References 

American women artists
1943 births
Minneapolis College of Art and Design faculty
2018 deaths
Place of birth missing
Place of death missing
21st-century American women